This is a list of speakers of the Parliament of Uganda, since 1962:

References

External links
 Website of Parliament of Uganda

Parliament of Uganda
Uganda